Butein is a chalcone of the chalconoids. It can be found in Toxicodendron vernicifluum (or formerly Rhus verniciflua), Dahlia, Butea (Butea monosperma) and Coreopsis It has antioxidative, aldose reductase and advanced glycation endproducts inhibitory effects. It is also a sirtuin-activating compound, a chemical compound having an effect on sirtuins, a group of enzymes that use NAD+ to remove acetyl groups from proteins. Buteins possess a high ability to inhibit aromatase process in the human body, for this reason, the use of these compounds in the treatment of breast cancer on the estrogen ground has been explored. The first attempts of sport pro-hormone supplementation with the use of buteins took place in Poland.

References

Chalconoids